B. Satyan (born 30 May 1965) is an Indian politician and a member of the 14th Kerala Legislative Assembly. He belongs to Communist Party of India (Marxist) and represents Attingal constituency.

References

Members of the Kerala Legislative Assembly
Communist Party of India (Marxist) politicians from Kerala
1965 births
Living people